6-pounder gun or 6-pdr, usually denotes a  gun firing a projectile weighing approximately .

Guns of this type include:

QF 6 pounder Hotchkiss, a 57 mm naval gun of the 1880s; a similar weapon was designed by Driggs-Schroeder for the US Navy
Driggs-Schroeder Marks II and III and Driggs-Seabury M1898 and M1900 57 mm guns on mobile mounts, used by the US Army circa 1890–1920
QF 6 pounder 6 cwt Hotchkiss, a British 57 mm tank gun of 1917
QF 6 pounder Nordenfelt, a 57 mm naval gun of the 1880s very similar to the Hotchkiss
Ordnance QF 6-pounder, a British 57 mm anti-tank and tank gun of World War II
QF 6 pounder 10 cwt gun, a British twin mount naval and coast defence gun 1937–1956.

Older types include:

Canon de 6 système An XI, a French 6-pounder muzzle-loading cannon of the Napoleonic era
M1841 6-pounder field gun, an American 6-pounder smoothbore muzzle-loading cannon of the mid-1800s

Guns denoted by calibre 
Examples simply referred to by caliber include:
Bofors 57 mm gun family, including a WW2 field AT gun, a WW2 57 mm × 230 mm aircraft autocannon and a still-current family of three 57 mm x 438 mm naval artillery gun/anti air autocannons
57 55 J, Finnish light coastal gun
57 mm anti-tank gun M1943 (ZiS-2), Soviet 57×480 mmR AT gun, also used on the ZiS-30
Ho-401 cannon, Japanese prototype aircraft autocannon
Type 97 57 mm tank gun, Japanese tank cannon
Ch-51(M), used on the Soviet assault gun ASU-57
AZP S-60, Soviet 57×347mmSR AA autocannon, also integrated into ZSU-57-2

Older types include:
5.7 cm Maxim-Nordenfelt, short fortress gun of the 1880s

See also
Naval artillery in the Age of Sail

57 mm artillery
Anti-tank guns